Étain is a commune in the Meuse department in Grand Est in north-eastern France.

Geography

History

The town, which dates from the late 7th/early 8th century, does not have any natural defense features so has fallen to the Prussians and Russians in 1815 right after the Battle of Waterloo, and to the Germans in 1870, 1914 and again in 1940.

Population

See also
 Communes of the Meuse department
 Étain-Rouvres Air Base
 Petitcollin
 Route nationale 18
 Sidi Brahim Barracks

References

External links

 The town of Etain

Communes of Meuse (department)
Duchy of Bar